Karambakudi block is a revenue block in Pudukkottai district, Tamil Nadu, India. It has 39 panchayat villages.

Villages of Karambakudi Block 
1.	karumali street 
2.	Athiranviduthi 
3.	Bandhuvakottai 
4.	Elaikadividuthi 
5.	Kalabam 
6.	Kaliyaranviduthi 
7.	Kannakkankadu 
8.	Karambaviduthi 
9.	Karu.keelatheru 
10.	Karu.therkkutheru 
11.	Karuppattipatti 
12.	Kattathi 
13.	Keerathur 
14.	Kulanthiranpattu 
15.	M.therkkutheru 
16.	Mailakonepatti 
17.	Malaiyur, Pudukkottai 
18.	Mankottai 
19.	Maruthakoneviduthi 
20.	Mudhalipatti 
21.	Mullankuruchi 
22.	Odappaviduthi 
23.	Pallavarayanpathai 
24.	Pappapatti 
25.	Pattathikkadu 
26.	Pilaviduthi 
27.	Ponnanviduthi 
28.	Puduviduthi 
29.	Rangiyanviduthi 
30.	Regunathapuram 
31.	Sengamedu 
32.	Theethanipatti 
33.	Theethanviduthi 
34.	Thirumanancheri 
35.	Vadatheru 
36.	Valankondanviduthi 
37.	Vandanviduthi 
38.	Vannakkankadu 
39.	Vellalaviduthi 
40.     Pattamaviduthi

References 

 

Revenue blocks of Pudukkottai district